Frontenac was a federal electoral district in Quebec, Canada, that was represented in the House of Commons of Canada from 1968 to 1997.

This riding was created in 1966 from parts of Lotbinière and Mégantic ridings. It was abolished in 1996 when it was redistributed into Beauce and Frontenac—Mégantic ridings.

Geography
It initially consisted of:
 the City of Thetford Mines;
 the Towns of Black Lake and Plessisville;
 the County of Mégantic;
 in the County of Frontenac: the village municipality of La Guadeloupe; the parish municipality of Courcelles; the municipalities of Saint-Évariste-de-Forsyth and Saint-Méthode-de-Frontenac;
 in the County of Beauce: the village municipality of East Broughton Station; the parish municipalities of Sacré-Coeur-de-Jésus and Sainte-Clothilde; the municipalities of East Broughton and Saint-Pierre-de-Broughton.

In 1976, it was redefined to consist of:
 the City of Thetford Mines;
 the Towns of Black Lake and Plessisville;
 the County of Mégantic;
 in the County of Beauce: the village municipality of East Broughton Station; the parish municipalities of Sacré-Coeur-de-Jésus and Sainte-Clothilde; the municipalities of East Broughton and Saint-Pierre-de-Broughton.
 in the County of Frontenac: the village municipality of La Guadeloupe; the parish municipality of Courcelles; the municipalities of Saint-Évariste-de-Forsyth and Saint-Méthode-de-Frontenac;
 in the County of Lotbinère: the village municipalities of Sainte-Agathe and Saint-Sylvestre; the parish municipalities of Sainte-Agathe and Saint-Sylvestre.

In 1987, it was redefined to consist of:
 the towns of Black Lake, Plessisville and Thetford Mines;
 the County of Mégantic;
 in the County of Beauce: the Village Municipality of East-Broughton-Station; the Parish Municipality of Sacré-Coeur-de-Jésus; the municipalities of East Broughton, Sainte-Clotilde-de-Beauce and Saint-Pierre-de-Broughton;
 in the County of Frontenac: the Municipality of Saint-Méthode-de-Frontenac;
 in the County of Lotbibière the village municipalities of Sainte-Agathe and Saint-Sylvestre; the parish municipalities of Sainte-Agathe and Saint-Sylvestre.

Members of Parliament
This riding elected the following Members of Parliament:

Election results

By-election: On Mr. Dumont's resignation, 6 April 1970

Due to the death of Social Credit candidate Nelson Lassard, the 1980 general election scheduled for February 18 was postponed until March 24.

See also 

 List of Canadian federal electoral districts
 Past Canadian electoral districts

External links
Riding history from the Library of Parliament

Former federal electoral districts of Quebec
Thetford Mines